Pomatias rivularis is a species of gastropods belonging to the family Pomatiidae.

The species is found near Black Sea.

References

Pomatiidae